Aliabad-e Bozorg (also Romanized as ‘Alīābād-e Bozorg) is a village in Seyyed Nasereddin Rural District, Zarrinabad District, Dehloran County, Ilam Province, Iran. At the 2006 census, its population was 145, in 25 families. The village is populated by Kurds.

References 

Populated places in Dehloran County
Kurdish settlements in Ilam Province